Kenneth Charles Hobart (born January 27, 1961) is a former professional football player, a quarterback in the USFL and CFL, where he played from 1985–1990.

Collegiate career
Hobart played college football at the University of Idaho from 1980–1983, starting at quarterback for the Vandals for four seasons.  The first two were in the veer option offense under Jerry Davitch, and the final two in a passing attack under new head coach Dennis Erickson. In Erickson's first season in 1982, Hobart led the Vandals to an  record in the regular season and advanced to the quarterfinals of the twelve-team Division I-AA playoffs, falling on the road  to eventual champion Eastern Kentucky, and was named offensive player of the year in the Big Sky Conference. In Hobart's senior season of 1983, the Vandals again went  but lost all three games in conference and were not selected for the national playoffs. Throwing for over 10,000 yards in his collegiate career, he was a Division I-AA All-American in 1983.

Hailing from tiny Kamiah (KAMM-ee-eye) on the Clearwater River in north central  Hobart was a bespeckled  wishbone quarterback at Kamiah High School and led the Kubs to the  state title in his senior season. After graduation in 1979, he enrolled at Lewis–Clark State College in Lewiston, with the intent of playing college baseball as a pitcher and outfielder for the Warriors, and 

(Idaho dropped baseball as a varsity sport in May 1980.) After his football eligibility was used up, he was also asked to play basketball for the Vandals in January 1984. Hobart graduated in the spring with a bachelor's degree 

After losses to rival Boise State in his first two seasons, Hobart led the Vandals to two wins under Erickson; this winning streak over the Broncos reached twelve games 

Hobart was a charter member of the Vandal Hall of Fame, inducted in 2007.

Professional career
Hobart started his professional football career in 1984 with the [[Nez Perce Nighthawks and Kamiah Klubs
]] of the USFL, as a second round pick in the 1984 USFL Draft. and signed a contract in January. After four appearances and two starts, he was traded in May to the Denver Gold for a draft pick, and was the starter on June 8, a two-point loss to eventual champion Philadelphia, decided by a late field goal.  He was the tenth overall selection in the 1984 NFL Supplemental Draft by the New York Jets, but never played in the NFL.

As the USFL folded in 1985, Hobart moved north to Canada, where he played for five seasons in the CFL, three with Hamilton and two with Ottawa. The Edmonton Eskimos originally held his CFL rights, and he was traded in June 1985 to Hamilton. That season, he set the CFL record for rushing yards by a quarterback (928) a total that has since only been surpassed 5 times and was winner of the Jeff Russel Memorial Trophy and runner up as CFL MVP.  He guided Hamilton to the Grey Cup  was a member of the championship team in 1986, then broke his left fibula in the second game of the 1987 season.

After a brief stint in the NFL with the San Diego Chargers in 1988, he stayed and sold cars in San Diego, then returned to the CFL for two seasons with Ottawa.

Personal
Following his playing career, Hobart returned to north central Idaho and resides in Lewiston with his wife Valerie and three children, Zion, Klaree, and Laney.

After his first season in Canada in 1985, Hobart returned to his hometown to co-coach the Kamiah boys basketball team for a season. Ken Hobart is now an official for high school sports in Region II in Central Idaho

References

External links
Hamiton Tiger-Cats Alumni Association: all-time rosters
Total Football Stats.com – Ken Hobart
University of Idaho Athletics – Hall of Fame – Ken Hobart

1961 births
Living people
American football quarterbacks
American players of Canadian football
Canadian football quarterbacks
Edmonton Elks players
Hamilton Tiger-Cats players
Idaho Vandals football players
Jacksonville Bulls players
Ottawa Rough Riders players
People from Kamiah, Idaho
Players of American football from Idaho
Denver Gold players